Qingxi Town is an urban town in and subdivision of Shaoshan, Hunan Province, China.  it had a population of 48,500 and an area of .

History
In 2015, Ruyi Town and Yongyi Township were merged into Qingxi Town.

Administrative division
The town is divided into 18 villages and 4 communities:
 Shaoshao Railway Station Community
 Zhuji Community
 Ruyiting Community
 Shaoshanchong Community
 Qingxi Village
 Shizhong Village
 Shishan Village
 Huayuan Village
 Chaoyang Village
 Yangjia Village 
 Yangrong Village 
 Qiushan Village 
 Ruyi Village 
 Meihu Village 
 Houluo Village 
 Shihu Village 
 Shaonan Village 
 Yongquan Village 
 Yongyi Village 
 Shishan Village 
 Changhu Village 
 Donghu Village 

Transportation

Expressway
The Shaoshan Expressway, which runs east through Yintian Town to Nanzhushan Town of Xiangtan County and the north through Huaminglou Town to Ningxiang. Its eastern terminus is at G60 Shanghai–Kunming Expressway and its northern terminus is at Changsha-Shaoshan-Loudi Expressway.

Provincial Highway
The S208 Provincial Highway runs east through Yintian Town to Nanzhushan Town of Xiangtan County and the north through Donghutang Town to Ningxiang.

Railway
The Shaoshan railway, from Xiangshao station of Xiangtan County to Shaoshan station in the town.

Religion
Huguo Temple is a Buddhist temple on the town.

Celebrity
, a major general in the People's Liberation Army.
, revolutionist.
, a general of the Republic of China Army.

References

External links

Divisions of Shaoshan
Towns of Hunan